Rukirabasaija Kasunga Nyaika Kyebambe l was Omukama of the Kingdom of Toro, from 1872 until 1875. He was the fifth (5th) Omukama of Toro.

Claim to the throne
He was the eldest son of Kaboyo Olimi l, Omukama of Toro, who reigned between 1866 and 1871 and between 1871 and 1872. It is not known who his mother was. He ascended to the throne following the death of his father in 1872.

Married life
The wives of Omukama Olimi II included:

 Vikitoria Kahinju, of the Ababopi clan, sister of Togwe Rusoke, sometime Prime Minister of Toro.

Offspring
The children of Omukama Olimi II included:

 Rukirabasaija Daudi Kasagama Kyebambe III, Omukama of Toro, who reigned between 1891 and 1928, whose mother was Vikitoria Kahinju.
 Prince (Omubiito) Musuga. He fled to Ankole where he was murdered on the orders of Kiboga, the Queen Mother of Ankole.
 Prince (Omubiito) Kamurasi. He fled to Ankole where he was murdered on the orders of Kiboga, the Queen Mother of Ankole.
 Prince (Omubiito) Zedekiya Nkojo.
 Princess (Omubiitokati) Mukakiyabara Maliza Bagaya Rwigirwa. She was installed as the Batebe to her brother Daudi Kasagama Kyebambe III, on August 16, 1891. In 1871, she married Rukirabasaija Agutamba Chwa II Kabarega, Omukama of Bunyoro-Kitara who was born in 1853. Daudi Agutamba Chwa was the second son of Rukirabasaija Agutamba Kyebambe IV Kamurasi, Omukama of Bunyoro-Kitara.
 Princess (Omubiitokati) Lilian Nyinabarongo.
 Princess (Omubiitokati) Leya Kakura.
 A daughter, whose name is not given, who in 1871 married Nyakusinga Rubambansi Mutambuka, the Omugabe of Ankole at that time.

His reign
In 1875, Omukama Olimi II was captured and deported to Bunyoro by an army sent by Omukama Chwa II Kabarega. He escaped when British and Buganda forces invaded Bunyoro in 1893/1894.  However, he died before he was able to return to Toro

The final years
Omukama Kyebambe Olimi II died in Buganda in 1894.

Succession table

See also
 Omukama of Toro

References

Toro
Toro people
19th-century rulers in Africa